Dendrobium lamyaiae is a miniature species of orchid native to Laos and Thailand.

References

External links 

lamyaiae
Orchids of Laos
Orchids of Thailand
Plants described in 1996